The 55th Kansai Ki-in 1st Place began on 24 November 2010. The defending champion is Murakawa Daisuke.

Tournament

References

2011 in go
Go competitions in Japan